W. Donn Hayes (1893–1973) was an American film editor active from the 1910s to the 1950s. He worked for a number of Hollywood studios including MGM, Fox Film and Paramount. He was sometimes credited simply as Donn Hayes.

Selected filmography

 The Girl of the Golden West (1915)
 Peck's Bad Boy (1921)
 Never the Twain Shall Meet (1925)
 Zander the Great (1925)
 The Carnival Girl (1926)
 A Harp in Hock (1927)
 Companionate Marriage (1928)
 The Chorus Kid (1928)
 Bare Knees (1928)
 San Francisco Nights (1928)
 The Head of the Family (1928)
 Hellship Bronson (1928)
 Turn Back the Hours (1928)
 The Rush Hour (1928)
 Times Square (1929)
 The Lost Zeppelin (1929)
 The Jazz Cinderella (1930)
 Ex-Flame (1930)
 The Bad One (1930)
 Puttin' On the Ritz (1930)
 Night Life in Reno (1931)
 Forgotten Women (1931)
 The She-Wolf (1931)
 A Fool's Advice (1932)
 The Dude Ranger (1934)
 Peck's Bad Boy (1934)
 Frontier Marshal (1934)
 Every Night at Eight (1935)
 When a Man's a Man (1935)
 The Cowboy Millionaire (1935)
 Tarzan Escapes (1936)
 Espionage (1937)
 Between Two Women (1937)
 The Thirteenth Chair (1937)
 Escape by Night (1937)
 Stablemates (1938)
 The Girl of the Golden West (1938)
 The Shopworn Angel (1938)
 Tell No Tales (1939)
 Stronger Than Desire (1939)
 The Ice Follies of 1939 (1939)
 Broadway Serenade (1939)
 Dancing Co-Ed (1939)
 Rebecca (1940)
 Diamond Frontier (1940)
 South to Karanga (1940)
 When the Lights Go On Again (1944)
 The Missing Corpse (1945)
 The Man Who Walked Alone (1945)
 Hollywood and Vine (1945)
 Down Missouri Way (1946)
 Bury Me Dead (1947)
 Stepchild (1947)
 Philo Vance's Secret Mission (1947)
 Philo Vance's Gamble (1947)
 Born to Speed (1947)
 The Gas House Kids in Hollywood (1947)
 Assigned to Danger (1948)
 Invasion, U.S.A. (1952)
 Torpedo Alley (1952)
 Mesa of Lost Women (1953)
 Paris Model (1953)

References

Bibliography
 Smith, David L. Hoosiers in Hollywood. Indiana Historical Society, 2006.

External links

1893 births
1973 deaths
American film editors
People from Indiana